Odegaard, Odegard, Ødegaard or Ødegård is a name of Scandinavian origin meaning "deserted farm".

Surname
People sharing one of these names as a surname include:
Alexander Ødegaard, Norwegian football player
Annika Odegard, voice actress
Charles Odegaard, (1911–1999), president of the University of Washington
Don Odegard, NFL cornerback
Hans Erik Ødegaard, Norwegian football player
Knut Jørgen Røed Ødegaard, Norwegian astrophysicist
Knut Ødegård, Norwegian writer
Martin Ødegaard, Norwegian football player
Ove Ødegaard, Norwegian football player
Peter H. Odegard, American political scientist
Reidar Ødegaard, cross country skier
Robert J. Odegard, American politician
Tor Øivind Ødegård, middle distance runner

Places
Places which include one these terms in their name include:
Ødegården Verk, an abandoned mine in Bamble, Norway
Odegaard Undergraduate Library, at the University of Washington

References

Surnames
Norwegian-language surnames